There are a number of approaches to ranking academic publishing groups and publishers. Rankings rely on subjective impressions by the scholarly community, on analyses of prize winners of scientific associations, discipline, a publisher's reputation, and its impact factor (particularly in the sciences).

Ranking challenges 
Publications are often judged by venue, rather than merit.  This has been criticized in the Leiden Manifesto and the San Francisco Declaration on Research Assessment. According to the manifesto, "Science and technology indicators are prone to conceptual ambiguity and uncertainty and require strong assumptions that are not universally accepted. The meaning of citation counts, for example, has long been debated. Thus, best practice uses multiple indicators to provide a more robust and pluralistic picture."

Moreover, studies of methodological quality and reliability have found that "reliability of published research works in several fields may be decreasing with increasing journal rank", contrary to widespread expectations.

In a study assessing an increasingly-diversified array of publishers and their service to the academic community, Janice S. Lewis concluded that college and university librarians ranked university presses higher and commercial publishers lower than did members of the American Political Science Association.

According to Colin Steele, a librarian at the Australian National Library in Canberra, "Listings of publishers by title also fail to take into account that some university presses are strong in certain disciplines, but not across the whole spectrum." Rankings can vary widely by discipline.

Australian Political Science Rankings 
The Australian Political Studies Association (APSA) has ranked academic publishers, taking into consideration both book and journal publication.

In 2007, their top-ranked (A+) publishers were:

Cambridge University Press
University of Chicago Press
Columbia University Press
Harvard University Press
MIT Press
Oxford University Press/Clarendon (UK/US)
Princeton University Press
Stanford University Press
University of California Press
Yale University Press

In 2007, their second-ranked (A) publishers were:

 Alfred A Knopf
 Allen & Unwin
 Cornell University Press
 Duke University Press
 Edward Elgar
 Elsevier Science Ltd
 IPA, Warsaw
 Johns Hopkins University Press
 Kluwer
 Manchester University Press
 Melbourne University Press
 New York University Press
 Palgrave MacMillan (UK & Australia, St Martins' Press in US)
 Politico's
 Polity Press
 Routledge (Taylor and Francis)
 Sage Publications
 Science Publishers
 Univ of Pennsylvania Press
 University of Michigan Press
 University of Minnesota Press
 University of New South Wales Press
 University of Toronto Press
 WHO/EDM, Geneva
 Wiley-Blackwell
 AP, London
 Basic Books, New York
 Blackwell, Oxford
 Clarendon Press, Gloucestershire, UK
 CRC, Ghent, Belgium
 CRC, New York
 Harper & Row, New York
 John Wiley & Sons, West Sussex, UK
 Pergamon Press, Oxford/Amsterdam
 Prentice Hall, Eaglewood Cliffs (NJ), USA
 Random House, New York
 Springer, London/Berlin

SENSE rankings 
The Research School for Socio-Economic and Natural Sciences of the Environment (SENSE Research School) has ranked scientific publishers every year from 2006 until 2022. This ranking was intended for internal use only and is not anymore available.

Spanish National Research Council rankings 
In 2012 and 2014, the Spanish National Research Council asked 11,864 Spanish academics to name the 10 most prestigious academic publishers from over 600 international and 500 Spanish-language publishers. It received 2,731 responses, a response rate of 23.05 percent. Results were compiled using a weighted average. The results were:
 Cambridge University Press
 Oxford University Press
 Springer Nature
 Routledge
 Elsevier
 Peter Lang
 Thomson Reuters
 Blackwell
 De Gruyter
 McGraw Hill

Granada Rankings 
To quantitatively assess the output of a publishing company, a research group associated with the University of Granada created a methodology based on the Thomson-Reuters Book Citation Index. The quantitative weight of the publishers is based on output data, impact (citations) and publisher profile. According to the Granada study, the 10 leading companies were:

 Springer
 Palgrave Macmillan
 Routledge
 Cambridge University Press
 Elsevier
 Nova Science Publishers
 Edward Elgar
 Information Age Publishing
 Princeton University Press
 University of California Press

Libcitation rankings 
The Research Impact Measurement Service (RIMS) at the University of New South Wales presented a quantitative methodology of bibliometric comparisons of book publishers. In a Journal of the American Society for Information Science and Technology article, Howard D. White et al. wrote: "Bibliometric measures for evaluating research units in the book-oriented humanities and social sciences are underdeveloped relative to those available for journal-oriented science and technology". The RIMS proposed what they called a "libcitation count", counting the libraries holding a given book as reported in a national (or international) union catalog. In the follow-up literature, comparing research units or even the output of publishing companies became the target of research. White et al. wrote,

Libcitations, according to the RIMS, reflect what librarians know about the prestige of publishers, the opinions of reviewers, and the reputations of authors.

Literature 

 Amsler, S. S., & Bolsmann, C. (2012). University ranking as social exclusion. British journal of sociology of education, 33(2), 283-301.

 Andrés, A. (2009). Measuring academic research : how to undertake a bibliometric study. Oxford : Chandos Publishing.

 Bornmann, L., Mutz, R., & Daniel, H. D. (2013). Multilevel‐statistical reformulation of citation‐based university rankings: The Leiden ranking 2011/2012. Journal of the American Society for Information Science and Technology, 64(8), 1649-1658.

 Braun, Tibor et al. (1985). Scientometric indicators : a 32 country comparative evaluation of publishing performance and citation impact. Singapore ; Philadelphia : World Scientific.

 Dill, D. D., & Soo, M. (2005). Academic quality, league tables, and public policy: A cross-national analysis of university ranking systems. Higher education, 49(4), 495-533.

 Donohue, Joseph C. (1974). Understanding scientific literatures: a bibliometric approach. Cambridge, MIT Press .

 Drummond, R., & Wartho, R. (2009). RIMS: the research impact measurement service at the University of New South Wales. Australian Academic & Research Libraries,

 Herb, U., Kranz, E., Leidinger, T., & Mittelsdorf, B. (2010). How to assess the impact of an electronic document? And what does impact mean anyway? Reliable usage statistics in heterogeneous repository communities. OCLC Systems & Services: International digital library perspectives, 26(2), 133-145.

 Hug, Sven E.; Ochsner, Michael; Daniel, Hans-Dieter. (2013). Criteria for assessing research quality in the humanities: a Delphi study among scholars of English literature, German literature and art history. Research Evaluation. Dec2013, Vol. 22 Issue 5, p369-383.

 Kousha, K., Thelwall, M., & Rezaie, S. (2011). Assessing the citation impact of books: The role of Google Books, Google Scholar, and Scopus. Journal of the American Society for Information Science and Technology, 62(11), 2147-2164.

 Oltersdorf, J. (2013). Publikationen: Funktion und Repräsentation (Doctoral dissertation, Humboldt-Universität zu Berlin, Philosophische Fakultät I).

 Rostaing, H., Boutin, E., & Mannina, B. (1999). Evaluation of internet resources: bibliometric techniques applications. cybermetrics, 99.

 Sadlak, J., & Liu, N. C. (2007). The world-class university and ranking: Aiming beyond status. Bucharest, Romania/Shanghai, China/Cluj-Napoca, Romania: Unesco-Cepes.

 Sahel, J. A. (2011). Quality versus quantity: assessing individual research performance. Science translational medicine, 3(84)

 Sieber, J., & Gradmann, S. (2011). How to best assess monographs?. Humboldt University Berlin.

 Tausch, A. (2011). On the Global Impact of Selected Social-Policy Publishers in More Than 100 Countries. Journal of Scholarly Publishing, 42(4), 476-513.

 Tausch, A. (2018). The Market Power of Global Scientific Publishing Companies in the Age of Globalization: An Analysis Based on the OCLC Worldcat (June 16, 2018). Journal of Globalization Studies, 9(2), 63-91. Also Available at SSRN: https://ssrn.com/abstract=3197632 or http://dx.doi.org/10.2139/ssrn.3197632. 

 Tausch, A. (2022). Beyond 'Channel Registers' Ways and Aberrations of Ranking International Academic Book Publishers (September 18, 2022). Available at SSRN: https://ssrn.com/abstract=4222481 or http://dx.doi.org/10.2139/ssrn.4222481.

 Taylor, P., & Braddock, R. (2007). International university ranking systems and the idea of university excellence. Journal of Higher Education Policy and Management, 29(3),

 Thelwall, M., Klitkou, A., Verbeek, A., Stuart, D., & Vincent, C. (2010). Policy‐ relevant Webometrics for individual scientific fields. Journal of the American Society for Information Science and Technology, 61(7), 1464-1475.

 Torres-Salinas, D., Robinson-García, N., & López-Cózar, E. D. (2012). Towards a Book Publishers Citation Reports. First approach using the Book Citation Index. arXiv preprint arXiv:1207.7067.

 Torres-Salinas, D., Robinson-García, N., Cabezas-Clavijo, Á., & Jiménez-Contreras, E. (2014). Analyzing the citation characteristics of books: edited books, book series and publisher types in the book citation index. Scientometrics, 98(3), 2113-2127.

 Torres-Salinas, D., Robinson-Garcia, N., Miguel Campanario, J., & Delgado López- Cózar, E. (2014). Coverage, field specialisation and the impact of scientific publishers indexed in the Book Citation Index. Online Information Review, 38(1), 24-42.

 Torres-Salinas, D., Rodríguez-Sánchez, R., Robinson-García, N., Fdez-Valdivia, J., & García, J. A. (2013). Mapping citation patterns of book chapters in the Book Citation Index. Journal of Informetrics, 7(2), 412-424.

 Usher, A., & Savino, M. (2007). A global survey of university ranking and league tables. Higher Education in Europe, 32(1), 5-15.

 Vinkler, Peter (2010). The evaluation of research by scientometric indicators. Oxford [England] : Chandos Publishing.

 Waltman, L., & Schreiber, M. (2013). On the calculation of percentile‐based bibliometric indicators. Journal of the American Society for Information Science and Technology, 64(2), 372-379.

 White, H. D.; Boell, Sebastian K.; Yu, H.; Davis, M.; Wilson, C. S.; Cole, Fletcher T.H. J. (2009) Libcitations: A measure for comparative assessment of book publications in the humanities and social sciences. Journal of the American Society for Information Science & Technology. Jun2009, Vol. 60 Issue 6, p1083-1096.

 Zuccala, A. A., & White, H. D. (2015). Correlating Libcitations and Citations in the Humanities with WorldCat and Scopus Data. In A. A. Salah, Y. Tonta, A. A. Akdag Salah, C. Sugimoto, & U. Al (Eds.), Proceedings of the 15th International Society for Scientometrics and Informetrics (ISSI), Istanbul, Turkey, 29th June to 4th July, 2015. (pp. 305-316). Bogazici University.

 Zuccala, A., & Guns, R. (2013). Comparing book citations in humanities journals to library holdings: Scholarly use versus perceived cultural benefit. In 14th international conference of the international society for scientometrics and informetrics (pp. 353-360).

 Zuccala, A., Guns, R., Cornacchia, R., & Bod, R. (2014). Can we rank scholarly book publishers? A bibliometric experiment with the field of history. Journal of the Association for Information Science and Technology.

 Zuccala, A., Someren, M., & Bellen, M. (2014). A machine‐learning approach to coding book reviews as quality indicators: Toward a theory of megacitation. Journal of the Association for Information Science and Technology, 65(11), 2248-2260.

See also
 Academic publishing
 Bibliometrics
 Citation impact
 Informetrics
 Publishing

References

Academic publishing companies

Library science
University and college rankings